The 1973–74 Edmonton Oilers season was the second season of operation of the Edmonton Oilers in the World Hockey Association. The Oilers' qualified for the playoffs, losing in the first round to the Minnesota Fighting Saints.

Offseason

Regular season

Final standings

Schedule and results

Playoffs

Player statistics

Note: Pos = Position; GP = Games played; G = Goals; A = Assists; Pts = Points; +/- = plus/minus; PIM = Penalty minutes; PPG = Power-play goals; SHG = Short-handed goals; GWG = Game-winning goals
      MIN = Minutes played; W = Wins; L = Losses; T = Ties; GA = Goals-against; GAA = Goals-against average; SO = Shutouts;

Awards and records

Transactions

Draft picks
Edmonton's draft picks at the 1973 WHA Amateur Draft.

Farm teams

See also
1973–74 WHA season

References

External links

Ed
Ed
Edmonton Oilers seasons